Hanila Parish was a rural municipality of Estonia, in Lääne County. In 2017, Hanila Parish, Lihula Parish, Koonga Parish, and Varbla Parish were merged to form Lääneranna Parish.

Local government 
Current chairman of the council (est: volikogu esimees) was Mardo Leiumaa.
The mayor (est: vallavanem) was Arno Peksar.

Populated places
Hanila Parish had one small town and 28 villages.

Small town
Virtsu

Villages

See also
Hanila museum
Battle of Karuse

References

External links
Official website 

 
Former municipalities of Estonia